This is a list of airlines currently operating in Kosovo:

See also
List of defunct airlines of Kosovo
List of airports in Kosovo
List of defunct airlines of Europe
List of airlines of Yugoslavia

Kosovo
Airlines
Kosovo